Hundvåkøy Church is an annex chapel of the Church of Norway in Austevoll Municipality in Vestland county, Norway. It is located in the village of Austevollshella on the island of Hundvåko. It is one of the five churches for the Austevoll parish which is part of the Fana prosti (deanery) in the Diocese of Bjørgvin. The white, concrete and wood chapel was built in a long church design in 1990 using plans drawn up by the architectural firm Planconsult based in Storebø. The chapel seats about 220 people.

History
Austevoll Church was located on the island of Hundvåko for over 200 years before it was moved to Storebø on a nearby island in 1891. The people living at the old church site were not happy about losing their local church. In the 1960s, planning began to build an annex chapel at the site of the old church. After lots of planning and fundraising, work on the new chapel began in 1989. The architectural firm Planconsult A/S was hired to design the new chapel. Nearly 100 years later, in 1990, a new chapel was completed on the old church site on Hundvåko.

See also
List of churches in Bjørgvin

References

Austevoll
Churches in Vestland
Long churches in Norway
Concrete churches in Norway
20th-century Church of Norway church buildings
Churches completed in 1990
1990 establishments in Norway